Fort Sainte Anne may refer to:

Canada
Fort Sainte Anne (Nova Scotia), on Cape Breton Island, Nova Scotia
Fort Albany, Ontario, formerly known as Fort Sainte Anne

United States
Fort Sainte Anne (Vermont), on Isle La Motte, Vermont